Faccioli is an Italian surname. Notable people with the surname include:

Emir Faccioli (born 1989), Argentine footballer
Giuseppe Faccioli (1877–1934), Italian electrical engineer
Orsola Faccioli (1823–1906), Italian painter
 (1845–1916), Italian painter

Italian-language surnames